Tatyana Aleksandrovna Tolmachova (née Granatkina, Гранаткина; 21 January 1907 – 21 October 1998) was a Russian figure skater, figure skating coach and one of the founders of Soviet figure skating school, Honoured Master of Sports of the USSR. She started skating as single skater and represented the club of Dynamo in the 1930s. Then she moved to pair skating with her husband Alexander Tolmachev.

Tolmachova was the leading ladies' coach. She worked in Moscow. Her husband Alexander Tolmachev headed the Moscow department of the Figure Skating Federation of Russia.

Since 1946, Tolmachova worked as a figure skating coach at the Young Pioneers Stadium school in Moscow, established with her help. Among her pupils were Vladimir Kovalev, Elena Tchaikovskaia, Lyudmila Pakhomova, Galina Kuhar, Alexander Vedenin, Tatiana Nemtsova, Elena Sheglova, Sergei Chetverukhin, Valentin Piseev.

Her brother Valentin Granatkin was a football, ice hockey and bandy player.

Results

Singles

Pairs
(with Tolmachev)

References

1907 births
Russian figure skating coaches
Soviet figure skating coaches
Honoured Masters of Sport of the USSR
Russian female pair skaters
Soviet female pair skaters
Figure skaters from Moscow
1998 deaths
Female sports coaches